Adelaide Youth Training Centre (also known as Kurlana Tapa – "New Path") is a youth detention centre at two campuses in  Cavan, an industrial northern suburb of Adelaide, South Australia. It is operated by the Government of South Australia Department of Human Services, unlike adult prisons which are operated by the Department for Correctional Services.

Jonal Drive
The Jonal Drive campus came into operation in 1993. It housed males aged between 10 and 14 years, and females aged between 10 and 20 years until August 2019, when the remaining inmates were transferred to Goldsborough Road. This was to initially be a six-month trial with the Jonal Drive facility retained and available if additional capacity is required, It has a capacity of 36 beds.

Goldsborough Road
The Goldsborough Road site was established in 2012 and replaced the Magill Youth Training Centre. It has a capacity of 60 beds. In August 2018, the remaining residents at Jonal Drive Campus were transferred to the newer Goldsborough Road site.

References

Prisons in Adelaide